Rodi is the Italian translation of Rhodes. It may refer to:

Places
Rodi (Prato Leventina), a Swiss village and hamlet of Prato Leventina, Canton of Ticino
Rodi Garganico, an Italian municipality in the Province of Foggia, Apulia
Rodì Milici, an Italian municipality in the Province of Messina, Sicily
Rodi e Kollatës, mountain peak in the Prokletije range in northern Albania

People

Surname
 Robert Rodi (born 1956), American novelist, playwright, comic book writer, essayist and performance artist
 Sani Yakubu Rodi (1975 or 1981 – 2002), Nigerian executed murderer
 Thomas John Rodi (born 1949), American prelate of the Roman Catholic Church

Given name
 Rodi Duarte (born 1991), Cape Verdean footballer
 Rodi Ferreira (born 1998), Paraguayan footballer
 Rodi Kratsa-Tsagaropoulou (born 1953), Greek politician and member of the European Parliament

Other
 Rodi language, a language spoken in Norway
 Rodi, another name for the Rodiya, an untouchable caste amongst the Sinhalese people of Sri Lanka

See also
 Rhodes (disambiguation)
 Roady (disambiguation)
 Roadie (disambiguation)
 Rhody (disambiguation)
 Rhodie
 Rhodey